Emerson is an active commuter railroad station in the borough of Emerson, Bergen County, New Jersey. The station, serviced by trains of the Pascack Valley Line from Spring Valley in Rockland County, New York to Hoboken Terminal in Hudson County, New Jersey, is located at the intersection of Kinderkamack Road (County Route 503) and Linwood Avenue in Emerson. The next station to the north is Westwood while the next to the south is Oradell. The station has a single track and single low-level side platform along Kinderkamack Road, without handicap accessibility under the Americans with Disabilities Act of 1990. 

Rail service through Emerson began on March 4, 1870, with the opening of the Hackensack and New York Extension Railroad from Anderson Street station in Hackensack to Hillsdale station in the eponymous borough. At the time of opening, the station was known as Kinderkamack. The area of Kinderkamack changed its name to Etna in 1877 when the post office changed. This changed in 1909 to Emerson.

Station layout

The station has one track and one low-level side platform. Permit parking is operated by the Borough of Emerson. Three permit parking lots area available, with 38, 20 and 44 spots, respectively.

References

External links

Borough of Emerson
Red and Tan Lines / Rockland Coaches site
Station and Station House from Google Maps Street View

Emerson, New Jersey
NJ Transit Rail Operations stations
Railway stations in Bergen County, New Jersey
Former Erie Railroad stations
Railway stations in the United States opened in 1870
1870 establishments in New Jersey